Blacker (styled BLACKER) is a U.S. Department of Defense computer network security project designed to achieve A1 class ratings (very high assurance) of the Trusted Computer System Evaluation Criteria (TCSEC). 

The first Blacker program began in the late 1970s, with a follow-on eventually producing fielded devices in the late 1980s.
It was the first secure system with trusted end-to-end encryption on the United States' Defense Data Network.

The project was implemented by SDC (software) and Burroughs (hardware), and after their merger, by the resultant company Unisys.

See also 
 RED/BLACK concept for segregation of sensitive plaintext information (RED signals) from encrypted ciphertext (BLACK signals)

References 

Computer network security
Computer security standards
Cryptography
Secure communication
Security engineering
Trusted computing
United States Department of Defense information technology